Stephen Lyon Crohn (September 5, 1946 – August 23, 2013) also known as "The man who can't catch AIDS", was a man notable for a genetic mutation, which caused him to be immune to AIDS.   He was a great-nephew of Burrill Bernard Crohn, for whom Crohn's disease is named.

Crohn had the "delta 32" mutation on the CCR5 receptor, a protein on the surface of white blood cells that is involved in the immune system and serves as an access route for many forms of HIV virus to enter and infect host cells. This mutation rendered him effectively immune to many forms of HIV.

Death
Crohn committed suicide by a drug overdose on oxycodone and benzodiazepines at the age of 66.

See also
 Timothy Ray Brown
Adam Castillejo
Innate resistance to HIV
Long-term nonprogressor
HIV/AIDS research

References

External links 
Video and text from a PBS documentary about Stephen Crohn and the discovery of CCR5

1946 births
2013 suicides
History of HIV/AIDS
Drug-related suicides in New York City
People from Manhattan
LGBT people from New York (state)
Drug-related deaths in New York City
Suicides in New York City